Leonid Leonidovich Obolensky (21 January 1902 —  17 November 1991) was a Russian and Soviet actor. Born into the family of a Soviet diplomat, he studied at the Gerasimov Institute of Cinematography.

Selected filmography
 On the Red Front (1920) as  Red Army soldier
 The Extraordinary Adventures of Mr. West in the Land of the Bolsheviks (1924) as dandy
 The Death Ray (1925) as Mayor Hard
 St. Jorgen's Day (1930) as film director
  A Very English Murder (1974) old lord Warbeck
 Walnut Bread (1978) as Andrius's grandfather
 Faktas (1981) as Alexandre

References

External links

Soviet male actors
Russian male actors
1902 births
1991 deaths
Soviet prisoners of war
Leonid
People's Artists of the RSFSR
People from Arzamas
Soviet male silent film actors
Russian male silent film actors